The Men's 800m athletics events for the 2012 Summer Paralympics took place at the London Olympic Stadium from August 31 to September 8. A total of 8 events were contested over this distance for 8 different classifications.

Schedule

Results

T12

 

 
Final
 
Competed 5 September 2012 at 19:35.

T13

 

 
Final
 
Competed 8 September 2012 at 11:55.

T36

 
There were no heats in this event. The final was competed on 6 September 2012 at 19:24.
 
Final
 
Competed 6 September 2012 at 19:24.

T37

 
There were no heats in this event. The final was competed on 1 September 2012 at 20:58.
 
Final
 
Competed 1 September 2012 at 20:58.

T46

 

 
Final
 
Competed 8 September 2012 at 21:02.

T52

 
There were no heats in this event. The final was competed on 7 September 2012 at 20:39.
 
Final
 
Competed 7 September 2012 at 20:39.

T53

 

 
Final
 
Competed 5 September 2012 at 19:43.

T54

 

 
Final
 
Competed 6 September 2012 at 21:16.

References

Athletics at the 2012 Summer Paralympics
2012 in men's athletics